The position of United States Ambassador to Sri Lanka and the Maldives has existed since 1949. Sri Lanka–United States relations and Maldives–United States relations have been friendly throughout the history of Sri Lanka and the history of the Maldives. The diplomatic mission representing the United States in both countries is located in Colombo, Sri Lanka. Jefferson House is the ambassadorial residence of the ambassador in Colombo.

Julie Chung has been confirmed to be the ambassador from the United States to Sri Lanka and the Maldives. She succeeded Alaina B. Teplitz to this position.

United States Ambassadors to Ceylon

United States Ambassadors to Sri Lanka

Notes

See also
Sri Lanka – United States relations
Maldives – United States relations
Foreign relations of Sri Lanka
Foreign relations of the Maldives
Ambassadors of the United States

References
United States Department of State: Background notes on Sri Lanka
United States Department of State: Background notes on the Maldives

External links
United States Department of State: Chiefs of Mission for Sri Lanka
United States Department of State: Chiefs of Mission for Maldives
United States Department of State: Sri Lanka
United States Department of State: Maldives
United States Embassy in Colombo

Sri Lanka

United States
Lists of ambassadors to Sri Lanka